Mihai Dobrescu (born 12 September 1992) is a Romanian professional footballer who plays as a defender for Liga I club UTA Arad .

References

External links
 
 Mihai Dobrescu at lpf.ro

1992 births
Living people
People from Ilfov County
Romanian footballers
Association football defenders
Liga I players
Liga II players
Liga III players
CSM Ceahlăul Piatra Neamț players
CS Otopeni players
AFC Chindia Târgoviște players
CS Balotești players
LPS HD Clinceni players
CS Gaz Metan Mediaș players
FC Universitatea Cluj players
FC UTA Arad players